Vartiokylä is a neighbourhood in the East Helsinki area of Helsinki, the capital of Finland. Its name is derived from the ruins of an eleventh-century fortress on the Linnanvuori hill in Vartioharju, one of Vartiokylä's subdivisions. The working population of Helsinki started building their houses in the area after the completion of Uusi Porvoontie, a road to the downtown, in the 1930s. Nowadays the area has a few high density apartment areas as well as houses. Vartiokylä became a part of Helsinki in 1946. Most of the services in the district are located in the subdivision of Itäkeskus, in the area around one of the largest shopping centers in the Nordic countries.

Public transport in the area relies heavily on the Helsinki Metro. The stations of Itäkeskus, Myllypuro and Puotila service the neighbourhood. Several bus lines serve the areas not within walking distance of the stations. Two major highways, Itäväylä and Kehä I, intersect in Vartiokylä.

External links